The People's Party ( / Narodna partija) was a political party in Serbia. It was founded and led by the former Mayor of Novi Sad and former Serbian Radical Party member Maja Gojković.

The party previously intended to take part in the next election together with the Democratic Party of Serbia and New Serbia. In 2010 the party left the populists and together with several other parties, formed the United Regions of Serbia, a broad coalition of regional parties.

The People's Party participated in the 2012 parliamentary elections as part of the United Regions of Serbia coalition, and received 2 seats in the National Assembly. The party was expelled from the URS after it separately entered negotiations with the Democratic Party.

On 3 December 2012 the party merged into the Serbian Progressive Party and ceased to exist. However, some local councils headed by Nebojša Korać opposed this decision, and controversially continued receiving finances proportional to the party's original electoral result, even though both MPs had left the party.

References

External links
Former website

Conservative parties in Serbia
Eastern Orthodox political parties
Political parties established in 2008
2008 establishments in Serbia
Defunct political parties in Serbia